Gorsuch is a surname of English origin. The name is a habitational name, named after the hamlet of Gorsuch (earlier, Gosefordsich) in Lancashire. The name is derived from the Old English Gosford ("goose ford") + sic ("small stream").

People named Gorsuch 
 Anne Gorsuch Burford (1942–2004), administrator of the Environmental Protection Agency
 Dave Gorsuch (1938–2021), American skier (see Alpine skiing at the 1960 Winter Olympics)
 Dick Gorsuch (1878–1934), Australian rules footballer
 Harry Gorsuch, (fl. 1978-1986) American actor
 John Gorsuch (fl. 1430s), English academic, Vice-Chancellor of the University of Oxford
 Neil Gorsuch (born 1967), Associate Justice of the Supreme Court of the United States; son of Anne Gorsuch Burford

References